Clinteria chloronota is a species of flower scarab endemic to Sri Lanka.

References 

Cetoniinae
Insects of Sri Lanka
Insects described in 1850